Paduka Sri Sultan Salehuddin ibni Almarhum Sultan Mahmud Shah I (died 1636) was the ninth Sultan of Perak. He was the son of the eighth Sultan of Perak, Sultan Mahmud Shah I.

In the year 1630, Raja Kobat the son of the late Sultan Mahmud Shah I was appointed as the 9th Sultan of Perak with the title of Sultan Salehuddin after the death of his father. During his reign, the entire state of Perak was said to have been hit by a cholera epidemic that was quite deadly. The disease outbreak has caused many people in Perak to die. Sultan Salehuddin is said to have sailed to Kampar, which is located in Sumatra, and died there in 1636. The late Sultan Salehuddin is referred to as Marhum Mangkat di Kampar.

According to the document, History of the Kampar Society in the Peninsula and its contribution to developing Malaysia issued by Ikatan Kampar Putra Malaysia (IKMAL), the relationship between the state of Perak and the state of Kampar began from the reign of the first Sultan of Perak and continued until the reign of Sultan Salehuddin. People from Kampar also came to migrate to the state of Perak and they were concentrated in Dinding areas such as Manjung and in the Beruas area.

Due to the lack of documentation and references, not much further information can be found regarding the story of Sultan Salehuddin. The exact location of the tomb of Sultan Salehuddin in Kampar is also unknown. With his death, the direct male line descendants of the Sultan of Perak were cut off.

References 

Sultans of Perak
1636 deaths
Royal House of Perak
Malay people
People of Malay descent
Muslim monarchs
Sultans
Sunni monarchs
People from Perak